Corrado Gaipa (13 March 1925 – 21 September 1989) was an Italian actor and voice actor.

Gaipa was a well known actor of Italian cinema as well as dubbing voices. However, he was widely known for his role as Don Tommasino in The Godfather.

Biography
Born in Palermo, Gaipa enrolled in the Silvio d'Amico Academy of Dramatic Arts, where he studied for three years and performed an adaptation of the play You Can't Take It with You. He then graduated in 1946. In 1948, Gaipa joined a theatre group based in Rome and he began doing radio dramas which were broadcast in many cities across Italy such as Turin, Florence and Milan. He also appeared in many films such as the 1969 film That Splendid November. Internationally, he was well known for having played Don Tommasino in the 1972 film The Godfather directed by Francis Ford Coppola.

While also active on stage, radio and television, he was mainly active as a voice actor and a dubber. As for Gaipa's activity as a voice actor, he was the Italian voice of Obi-Wan Kenobi (portrayed by Alec Guinness) in the Star Wars original trilogy as well as Bagheera in the Italian-Language version of The Jungle Book. He also dubbed over the voices of Lionel Stander, Eli Wallach, Peter Ustinov, Rod Steiger, Orson Welles, Burt Lancaster and Spencer Tracy. He also assisted with the foundation of a dubbing company in the 1970s alongside Renato Turi, Giancarlo Giannini, Valeria Valeri, Oreste Lionello and other historical dubbers.

Illness and death
In Gaipa's later years, he had serious health problems. He went from using a walking stick to using a wheelchair and he died in Rome on 21 September 1989, at the age of 64. At the time of his death, he had just signed to reprise the role of Don Tommasino in The Godfather Part III. The role was instead passed on to Vittorio Duse.

Filmography

Cinema

 West and Soda (1965) - (voice)
 Shoot Twice (1968) - (voice)
 VIP my Brother Superman (1968) - (voice)
 That Splendid November (1969) - Uncle Alfio
 The Pizza Triangle (1970) - President of tribunal
 Metello (1970) - Badolati
 The Man with Icy Eyes (1971) - Isaac Thetman
 The Fifth Cord (1971) - Editor
 My Dear Killer (1972) - Head of Insurance Company
 Execution Squad (1972) - L'avvocato Armani
 The Godfather (1972) - Don Tommasino 
 The Eroticist (1972) - Don Gesualdo
 Shadows Unseen (1972) - Günther Rosenthal
 Without Family (1972) - Giudice
 Il caso Pisciotta (1972) - Direttore del carcere
 The Sicilian Connection (1972) - Calogero
 Il Boss (1973) - Avvocato Rizzo
 I Kiss the Hand (1973) - Don Emilio Grisanti
 1931: Once Upon a Time in New York (1973) - Mob Boss
 The Black Hand (The Birth of the Mafia) (1973) - Lawyer
 Tony Arzenta (1973) - Arzenta's Father
 Chino (1973) - Padre
 Anna, quel particolare piacere (1973) - Doctor
 Giordano Bruno (1973)
 The Sinful Nuns of Saint Valentine (1974) - Father Onorio
 What Have They Done to Your Daughters? (1974) - Prosecutor
 Prigione di donne (1974) - Magistrate
 Illustrious Corpses (1976) - Supposed Mafioso
 The Red Nights of the Gestapo (1977) - Udo Kassbaum
 I vizi morbosi di una governante (1977) - The Inspector
 La malavita attacca... la polizia risponde! (1977) - Dottore
 A Spiral of Mist (1977) - Pietro Sangermano
 Giuseppe Fava: Siciliano come me (1984) - (final film role)

Television
 La rosa bianca (1971, TV Movie)
 Maigret va in pensione (1972) - Germain Cageot
 Napoleone a Sant'Elena (1973) - Lord Liverpool
 Ho incontrato un'ombra (1974) - Buache
 Ritratto di donna velata (1975) - Il Nebbia
 Il marsigliese (1975) - Tanino Sciacca
 La mossa del cavallo (1977) - Il maestro
 Storie della camorra (1978) - Onorevole Colajanni
 La dama dei veleni (1979) - Guido Santacroce
 Marco Polo (1982) - Senator

Dubbing roles

Animation 
Bagheera in The Jungle Book
Scat Cat in The Aristocats
Abraracourcix in Asterix the Gaul
Owl in Winnie the Pooh and the Blustery Day

Live action 
Obi-Wan Kenobi in Star Wars: Episode IV – A New Hope
Obi-Wan Kenobi in Star Wars: Episode V – The Empire Strikes Back
Obi-Wan Kenobi in Star Wars: Episode VI – Return of the Jedi
Frank Poole's Father in 2001: A Space Odyssey
Brett McBain in Once Upon a Time in the West
Sanchez in Bananas
Matt Drayton in Guess Who's Coming to Dinner
Ron Hamer in Great White
Adam Coffin in The Deep
Bill Gillespie in In the Heat of the Night
Italo Bombolini in The Secret of Santa Vittoria
Lord Scrumptious in Chitty Chitty Bang Bang
Emilio Pajetta in The Hindenburg
M in On Her Majesty's Secret Service
Captain Blackbeard in Blackbeard's Ghost
Sergei Zharkov in Scorpio
Captain Hornsby in Too Late the Hero
Pater Hoffmann in Ludwig
Theo Van Horn in Ten Days' Wonder
Roman Castevet Rosemary's Baby
Leo Joseph Smooth in Never a Dull Moment
Colonel Clay Thornbush in Private Benjamin
Colonel Cascorro in Tepepa
Judge Adam Fenton in Hang 'Em High
William Marshall in The Lion in Winter
Don Fabrizio Corbera in The Leopard
Archer J. Maggott in The Dirty Dozen
Cardinal Leone in The Shoes of the Fisherman
William F. Kinderman in The Exorcist
Harvey Lapchance in The Man Who Loved Cat Dancing
Sheriff Lyle Wallace in Convoy
Auguste Maroilleur in La Horse
Carl Bugenhagen in Damien: Omen II
Tramp in A Clockwork Orange

References

External links 

 
 
 

1925 births
1989 deaths
Male actors from Palermo
Italian male film actors
Italian male voice actors
Italian male stage actors
Italian male television actors
Italian male radio actors
Accademia Nazionale di Arte Drammatica Silvio D'Amico alumni
20th-century Italian male actors